Hypalon is a chlorosulfonated polyethylene (CSPE) synthetic rubber (CSM) noted for its resistance to chemicals, temperature extremes,  and ultraviolet light. It was a product of DuPont Performance Elastomers, a subsidiary of DuPont. Hypalon as it is now known in the marine industry today is a remarketed version of the old Hypalon using an additional layer of neoprene (cr) so the new chemical formulation is csm/cr.

Chemical structure
Polyethylene is treated with a mixture of chlorine and sulfur dioxide under UV-radiation.  The product contains 20-40% chlorine. The polymer also contains a few percent chlorosulfonyl (ClSO2-) groups.  These reactive groups allow for vulcanization, which strongly affects the physical durability of the products.  An estimated 110,000 tons/y were produced in 1991.

Discontinuance
DuPont Performance Elastomers announced on May 7, 2009, that it intended to close its manufacturing plant in Beaumont, Texas, by June 30, 2009.  This was DPE's sole plant for CSM materials. The company was therefore exiting the business for Hypalon and its related product, Acsium. The plant closure was delayed until April 20, 2010, in response to customer requests.

References

Elastomers
Brand name materials